Pantón is a municipality of northwestern Spain, in the province of Lugo; in a mountainous district, watered by the rivers Miño, Cabe and Sil River. Its population in 2002 was 3,377. Livestock is extensively reared, and large quantities of wheat, wine, oats, and potatoes are produced. The other industries are distilling and linen manufacture. The nearest railway station is 6 mi. east, at Monforte de Lemos.

References

 

Municipalities in the Province of Lugo